Roshni Prakash is an Indian actress and model. She was a finalist in Femina Miss India South in 2016. After making her film debut in 2016 with the Telugu film Saptagiri Express, she appeared in the Kannada films Ajaramara and Kavaludaari and Tamil film Jada in 2019.

Career 
Roshni Prakash graduated in engineering and applied for a masters degree in Australia. In the process, she was cast in the Kannada film Kavaludaari (2019).

Filmography

References

External links

Living people
Actresses from Karnataka
People from Kodagu district
1993 births